In logic and philosophy, S5 is one of five systems of modal logic proposed by 
Clarence Irving Lewis and Cooper Harold Langford in their 1932 book Symbolic Logic. 
It is a normal modal logic, and one of the oldest systems of modal logic of any kind. It is formed with propositional calculus formulas and tautologies, and inference apparatus with substitution and modus ponens, but extending the syntax with the modal operator necessarily  and its dual possibly .

The axioms of S5

S5 is characterized by the axioms:
K: ;
T: ,

and either:

 5: ;
 or both of the following:
 4: , and
 B: .

The (5) axiom restricts the accessibility relation  of the Kripke frame to be Euclidean, i.e. .

Kripke semantics
In terms of Kripke semantics, S5 is characterized by models where the accessibility relation is an equivalence relation: it is reflexive, transitive, and symmetric.

Determining the satisfiability of an S5 formula is an NP-complete problem. The hardness proof is trivial, as S5 includes the propositional logic. Membership is proved by showing that any satisfiable formula has a Kripke model where the number of worlds is at most linear in the size of the formula.

Applications
S5 is useful because it avoids superfluous iteration of qualifiers of different kinds. For example, under S5, if X is necessarily, possibly, necessarily, possibly true, then X is possibly true. Unbolded qualifiers before the final "possibly" are pruned in S5. While this is useful for keeping propositions reasonably short, it also might appear counter-intuitive in that, under S5, if something is possibly necessary, then it is necessary.

Alvin Plantinga has argued that this feature of S5 is not, in fact, counter-intuitive. To justify, he reasons that if X is possibly necessary, it is necessary in at least one possible world; hence it is necessary in all possible worlds and thus is true in all possible worlds. Such reasoning underpins 'modal' formulations of the ontological argument.

S5 is equivalent to the  adjunction .

Leibniz proposed an ontological argument for the existence of God using this axiom. In his words, "If a necessary being is possible, it follows that it exists actually".

S5 is also the modal system for the metaphysics of saint Thomas Aquinas and in particular for the Five Ways.

See also
 Modal logic
 Normal modal logic
 Kripke semantics

References

External links
 http://home.utah.edu/~nahaj/logic/structures/systems/s5.html
 Modal Logic at the Stanford Encyclopedia of Philosophy

Modal logic